Cheryl Ramos-Cosio, better known as Che Ramos, is a Filipino actress and a fitness trainer. Ramos is known for her association with the Philippine New Wave Cinema and starring in Jerrold Tarog's Mangatyanan (2009), Senior Year (2010) and Goyo: Ang Batang Heneral (2018), and Brillante Mendoza's Captive (2012). She also starred in Prima Donnas as Darcy. In 2022, Ramos portrays the role of Dra. Katie Enriquez in the Philippine television medical drama, Abot-Kamay na Pangarap.

Early life and family
Cheryl Ramos graduated with a bachelor's degree in sociology from the University of the Philippines Los Baños.

Career 
Ramos-Cosio began her career under the screen name Cheryl Cosio, appearing in the 2004 Laurice Guillen film Santa Santita.

In 2009, she played her first role in a Jerrold Tarog film, as the lead character in Mangatyanan. She later played "Ms. Joan" in Tarog's short film Faculty, which went viral in the runup to the 2010 Philippine presidential election. After that, she became one of Tarog's most regular collaborators, reprising the "Ms. Joan" role in Senior Year (2010), and playing roles in the 2018 runaway blockbuster Goyo: The Boy General.

She co-starred with Isabelle Huppert in the 2012 Brillante Mendoza film Captive. Other films in which she has appeared include Ka Oryang, Sundalong Kanin, Mariquina, A Second Chance, and Kung Paano Hinihintay ang Dapithapon.

Family life 
Ramos-Cosio is married to fellow actor Chrome Cosio, with whom she has one daughter. Cosio and her spouse are fitness trainers.

References

External links
 

Living people
Filipino film actresses
Filipino television actresses
GMA Network personalities
1981 births